William E. Jones (born September 4, 1944) is an American retired college basketball head coach. He guided the Jacksonville State University men's basketball team to the 1985 NCAA Division II national championship. That year, the Gamecocks lost their first game of the season but then went on to win 31 consecutive games to claim the national title. They went 16–0 in Gulf South Conference play en route to the school-record 31–1 mark. In his career at Jacksonville State, he guided them to 8 NCAA Division II Tournament appearances and 6 Gulf South championships. Jones oversaw the program's transition from Division II to Division I in the 1995–96 season when they joined the Trans America Athletic Conference.

Jones also played for Jacksonville State, earning varsity letters in 1964–65 and 1965–66. As a senior in 1965–66 he earned All-American status.

References

1944 births
Living people
American men's basketball coaches
American men's basketball players
Basketball coaches from Alabama
Basketball players from Alabama
College men's basketball head coaches in the United States
Jacksonville State Gamecocks men's basketball coaches
Jacksonville State Gamecocks men's basketball players
Jones, Bill, 1944
Small forwards